Oscar Laranjeiras Airport  is the airport serving Caruaru, Brazil.

It is operated by Dix Empreendimentos.

History
The airport was commissioned in 1985 but remained closed from 2003 to 2006 due to repair works on the apron: twice, in 2000 and 2002, the apron collapsed under the weight of aircraft.

Previously operated by Infracea, on May 16, 2022 the concessionary Dix Empreendimentos started operating the facility.

Airlines and destinations

Access

See also

List of airports in Brazil

References

External links

Airports in Pernambuco
Airports established in 1985
Caruaru
1985 establishments in Brazil